Inner Austria was a term used from the late 14th to the early 17th century for the Habsburg hereditary lands south of the Semmering Pass, referring to the Imperial duchies of Styria, Carinthia and Carniola and the lands of the Austrian Littoral. The residence of the Inner Austrian archdukes and stadtholders was at the Burg castle complex in Graz.

Geography
The Inner Austrian territory stretched from the northern border with the Archduchy of Austria on the Alpine divide over Upper and Lower Styria down to Carniola, where the Lower and White Carniolan lands (the former Windic March) bordered on the Habsburg Kingdom of Croatia. In the west, the Carinthian lands stretched to the Archbishopric of Salzburg and the Habsburg County of Tyrol, while in the east, the Mur River formed the border with the Kingdom of Hungary.

In the south, the County of Görz, which had passed to the House of Habsburg in 1500, and Duino (Tybein) bordered on the Domini di Terraferma of Venice. The Imperial Free City of Trieste on the Adriatic Coast linked to assorted smaller possessions in the March of Istria around Pazin and the free port of Rijeka (later corpus separatum of Fiume) in Liburnia.

History

The Styrian lands had already been ruled in personal union by the Babenberg dukes of Austria since 1192 and were finally seized with the Austrian lands by the Habsburg king Rudolph I of Germany upon his victory in the 1278 Battle on the Marchfeld. In 1335 Rudolph's grandson Duke Albert II of Austria also received the Carinthian duchy with the adjacent March of Carniola at the hands of Emperor Louis the Bavarian as Imperial fiefs.

When in 1365 Albert's son Duke Rudolf IV of Austria suddenly died at the age of 26, Emperor Charles IV enfeoffed his younger brothers Albert III with the Pigtail and Leopold III the Just, who however began to quarrel about the Habsburg heritage. By the 1379 Treaty of Neuberg they finally split late Rudolf's territories: The elder Albertinian line would rule in the Archduchy of Austria proper (then sometimes referred to as "Lower Austria" (Niederösterreich), but comprising modern Lower Austria and most of Upper Austria), while the younger Leopoldian line ruled the Styrian, Carinthian and Carniolan duchies, then subsumed under the denotation of "Inner Austria". At that time their share also comprised Tyrol and the original Habsburg possessions in Swabia, called Further Austria; both collectively referred to as "Upper Austria" (Oberösterreich) in that context, also not to be confused with the modern state of that name.

When Leopold III was killed in the 1386 Battle of Sempach against the Old Swiss Confederacy, the Leopoldian heritage fell to his eldest son Duke William the Courteous, who upon the death of his uncle Albert III in 1395 also raised claims to the Archduchy of Austria against Albert's only son and heir Duke Albert IV. Both sides came to an agreement to maintain the Neuberg division but also to assert the common rule over the Habsburg lands. Therefore, from 1404 William acted as Austrian regent for his minor nephew Albert V. The Tyrolean and Further Austrian lands passed to William's younger brother Duke Leopold IV the Fat. When Duke William died without issue in 1406, the Leopoldian line was further split among his younger brothers: while Leopold IV assumed the regency in Austria, the Inner Austrian territories passed to Ernest the Iron, while the Tyrolean/Further Austrian passed to the youngest brother Frederick of the Empty Pockets.

In 1457 the Leopoldian line again could assume the rule over the Austrian archduchy, when Ernest's son Duke Frederick V of Inner Austria succeeded his Albertine cousin Ladislaus the Posthumous who had died without issue. 1490 saw the reunification of all Habsburg lines, when Archduke Sigismund of Further Austria and Tyrol resigned in favour of Frederick's son Maximilian I. In 1512, the Habsburg territories were incorporated into the Imperial Austrian Circle.

The dynasty however was split up again in 1564 among the children of deceased Emperor Ferdinand I of Habsburg. Under the Inner Austrian line founded by his younger son Archduke Charles II, the lands became a centre of the Counter-Reformation, carried out by the Jesuits with great determination. The cadet branch prevailed again, when Charles' son and successor as regent of Inner Austria, Archduke Ferdinand II, was crowned King of Bohemia in 1617, King of Hungary in 1618, and finally succeeded his cousin Matthias in the Archduchy of Austria (as Ferdinand III) and as Holy Roman Emperor in 1619. His intentions to translate the absolutist and anti-reformationist Inner Austrian policies to the Crown of Bohemia sparked the Thirty Years' War.

The Further Austrian/Tyrolean line of Ferdinand's younger brother Archduke Leopold V survived until the death of his son Sigismund Francis in 1665, whereafter all territories ultimately returned to common control with the other Austrian Habsburg lands. The political administration of Inner Austria was centralized at Graz in 1763. Inner Austrian stadtholders went on to rule until the days of Empress Maria Theresa in the 18th century.

Administration from 1748

Duchy of Styria
Lower Styria
Graz District: 
Marburg District
Cilli District
Upper Styria
Bruck District 
Judenburg District
Duchy of Carinthia
Klagenfurt District (Lower Carinthia)
Villach District (Upper Carinthia)
Duchy of Carniola
Laibach District (Upper Carniola)
Adelsberg District (Inner Carniola and Istria)
Neustadtl District (Lower Carniola)
Princely County of Gorizia and Gradisca
Görz District
Imperial Free City of Trieste
Triest District

Rulers of Inner Austria

Leopoldian line

|width=auto| Leopold III the Just1379–1386
|  
| 1 November 1351Viennafourth son of Albert the Wise and Joanna of Pfirt
| Viridis Visconti 23 February 1365Viennasix children
| 9 July 1386Sempachaged 34
|-
|width=auto| William the Courteous1386–1406
|  
| c. 1370Viennaeldest son of Leopold the Just and Viridis Visconti
| Joan II of Naples13 November 1401 Viennano issue
| 15 July 1406Viennaaged 36
|-
|width=auto| Leopold IV the Fat1406–1411
|  
| c. 1371Viennasecond son of Leopold the Just and Viridis Visconti
| Catherine of Burgundy15 August 1393Viennano issue
| 3 June 1411Viennaaged 40
|-
|width=auto| Ernest the Iron1406–1424
|  
| c. 1377Bruck an der Murthird son of Leopold the Just and Viridis Visconti
| (1) Margaret of Pomerania14 January 1392Bruck an der Murno issue(2) Cymburgis of Masovia25 January 1412Krakównine children
| 10 June 1424Bruck an der Muraged 47
|-
|width=auto| Frederick V the Peaceful1457–1493
|  
| 21 September 1415Innsbruckfirst son of Ernest the Iron and Cymburgis of Masovia
| Eleanor of Portugal16 March 1452Romefive children 
| 19 August 1493Linzaged 77
|-
|}
Frederick became Archduke of Austria in 1457, Habsburg territories united in 1490.

Inner Austrian line

|width=auto| Charles II1564–1590
|  
| 3 June 1540Viennafourth son of Ferdinand I and Anne of Bohemia and Hungary
| Maria Anna of Bavaria26 August 1571Viennafifteen children
| 10 July 1590Grazaged 50
|-
|width=auto| Ferdinand II1590–1637''under regency of Ernest of Austria (1590–1593) Maximilian III (1593–1595)
|  
|  9 July 1578Grazsecond son of Charles II and Maria Anna of Bavaria
| (1) Maria Anna of Bavaria23 April 1600Grazseven children(2) Eleonor Gonzaga2 February 1622Innsbruckno issue
| 15 February 1637Viennaaged 58
|-
|}
Ferdinand became Holy Roman Emperor in 1619.

See also
History of Austria
History of Slovenia
Further Austria

References 

History of Upper Austria
Political history of Slovenia
Former states and territories in Slovenia